Eana samarcandae is a species of moth of the family Tortricidae. It is found in Uzbekistan and Kyrgyzstan.

References

Moths described in 1958
Cnephasiini